Jonathon Patton (born 20 May 1993) is a former professional Australian rules footballer who played for the Greater Western Sydney Giants and Hawthorn Football Club in the Australian Football League (AFL)

Patton was taken with first selection in the 2011 AFL draft. Originally from Rowville, the 197 cm, 101 kg forward played for the Eastern Ranges in the 2011 TAC Cup season and was predicted to be the No 1 draft pick from early in the season. He was referred to by many as “The General”. He retired midway through the 2021 AFL season having played 95 games

Personal life
Patton played his junior football with St Simons Knights Football Club, based in Rowville, before joining the Eastern Ranges in the TAC Cup. He was a member of the AIS AFL Academy and was awarded best and fairest for the Eastern Ranges in 2010, going on to be named captain of the squad in 2011.

For Jonathon's schooling he went to St Simon the Apostle Primary School, Rowville and then attended Nazareth College until Year 11, then which he completed Year 12 at Rowville Secondary College.

His older brother, Chris Patton, is a basketball player who played for the University of California, Riverside, and also for Melbourne United in the National Basketball League.

Career
Patton travelled to Stockholm, Sweden in early 2012 for treatment on a jumper's knee injury, and missed the first eleven rounds of the 2012 season. Patton played his first AFL game on 16 June against Richmond, kicking one goal from seven disposals. In round 3, 2013, Patton's tenth career game, he suffered a torn anterior cruciate ligament, which would see him miss the remainder of the 2013 season. In round 21, 2014 after having a break out year Patton re-tore his ACL in the right knee and underwent a traditional knee reconstruction, which saw him miss 12 months.

After returning late in 2015 for three games the club chose to rest him for the remainder of the regular season so that he could benefit from an uninterrupted preparation for the following 2016 season. Patton had his most productive season to date with his contested marking a highlight.

In 2017 the expectation that came with being number 1 draft pick began to be justified when he started to regularly win possessions and contests with his notable strength and marking skills. He had a career high 45 goals and 142 marks in his 22 games.

In 2018 Patton again injured his knee during a club training session requiring season ending surgery. He later tore his left ACL and missed the entire 2019 season.

In January 2021, Patton was stood down by Hawthorn for inappropriate behaviour after accusations were made that he inappropriately sent sexual images to several women over social media.

Patton retired from football on 16 April 2021, citing mental health issues.

Statistics

|- style=background:#EAEAEA
| 2012 ||  || 12
| 7 || 4 || 4 || 28 || 20 || 48 || 20 || 9 || 0.6|| 0.6||4.0 || 2.8 || 6.8 || 2.8 ||  1.3 || 0
|-
| 2013 ||  || 12
| 3 || 5 || 3 || 16 || 7 || 23 || 7 || 7 || 1.7 || 1.0 || 5.3 || 2.3 || 7.6 || 2.3 || 2.3 || 0
|- style=background:#EAEAEA
| 2014 ||  || 12
| 19 || 25 || 17 || 147 || 68 || 215 || 96 || 28 || 1.3 || 0.9 || 7.8 || 3.6 || 11.3 || 5.0 || 1.5 || 0
|-
| 2015 ||  || 12
| 3 || 3 || 3 || 20 || 9 || 29 || 13 || 4 || 1.0 || 1.0 || 6.7 || 3.0 || 9.7 || 4.3 || 1.3 || 0
|- style=background:#EAEAEA
| 2016 ||  || 12
| 23 || 38 || 16 || 160 || 75 || 235 || 131 || 33 || 1.7 || 0.7 || 7.0 || 3.2 || 10.2 || 5.7 || 1.4 || 5
|- 
| 2017 ||  || 12
| 22 || 45 || 23 || 191 || 100 || 291 || 142 || 36 || 2.1 || 1.1 || 8.7 || 4.5 || 13.2 || 6.5 || 1.6 || 6
|- style=background:#EAEAEA
| 2018 ||  || 12
| 12 || 10 || 10 || 89 || 74 || 163 || 58 || 32 || 0.8 || 0.8 || 7.4 || 6.2 || 13.6 || 4.8 || 2.7 || 0
|- 
| 2019 ||  || 12
| 0 || — || — || — || — || — || — || — || — || — || — || — || — || — || — || 0
|- style=background:#EAEAEA
| 2020 ||  || 25
| 6 || 3 || 2 || 18 || 11 || 29 || 11 || 4 || 0.5 || 0.3 || 3.0 || 1.8 || 4.8 || 1.8 || 0.7 || 0
|- class="sortbottom"
! colspan=3| Career
! 95 !! 133 !! 78 !! 669 !! 364 !! 1033 !! 478 !! 153 !! 1.4 !! 0.8 !! 7.0 !! 3.8 !! 10.9 !! 5.0 !! 1.6 !! 11
|}

Notes

Honours and achievements
Individual
 Greater Western Sydney leading goalkicker: 2017
 AFL Rising Star nominee: 2014

References

External links

Living people
1993 births
Greater Western Sydney Giants players
Hawthorn Football Club players
Australian rules footballers from Melbourne
Eastern Ranges players
People from the City of Knox